A cockpit is a name for the location of controls of a vessel; while traditionally an open well in the deck of a boat outside any deckhouse or cabin, in modern boats they may refer to an enclosed area. Smaller boats typically have an aft cockpit, towards the stern of the boat, whereas larger vessels may provide a center cockpit with greater protection from weather. On a recreational sailboat, the cockpit is considered the most safe external location for crew.

 A bridge deck is a raised separation between an external cockpit and cabin or saloon, used to keep water from astern from entering from the cockpit, especially in following seas.

History
In the Royal Navy, the term cockpit originally referred to the area where the coxswain was stationed. This led to the word being used to refer to the area towards the stern of a small decked vessel that houses the rudder controls. The midshipmen and master's mates were later berthed in the cockpit, and it served as the action station for the ship's surgeon and his mates during battle.

References

Sailboat components
Sailing ship components